George Midenyo Oguk is a retired Kenyan striker who featured for Kenyan Premier League sides Mathare United, Tusker F.C., Gor Mahia F.C., Nairobi City Stars, Wazito F.C. and Kenya.

He also featured for Norwegian side Raufoss IL, Swedish sides Mjölby AI FF and Husqvarna FF, and Sidama Coffee S.C. in Ethiopia. He is now a coach.

Club career
Midenyo started his career at Mathare United in 2002 and after five seasons joined Tusker F.C. for a season. He then moved to Norwegian side Raufoss IL in 2007 then to Swedish side Mjölby AI FF the same year. In 2008 he joined Husqvarna FF and spent two seasons before returning to Mjölby AI FF.

In 2011 he was back from scandinavia and rejoined Tusker F.C. In 2012 he joined Gor Mahia F.C. for two seasons then landed at Nairobi City Stars for the 2014 season.

Thereafter, he moved to Sidama Coffee S.C. for two seasons before returning to Kenya to join Wazito F.C. in the second tier.

Coaching
After half a season at Wazito F.C., Midenyo switched to the bench to become an assistant coach and served for a season and a half.

After coaching private entities and schools, Midenyo was back to coaching at club level. This includes Mt. Kenya United in the second tier and Mathare United in the Kenyan topflight.

He currently holds a CAF 'B' Diploma in coaching.

International
Midenyo was called up to the Kenya national football team in 2010 by head coach Reinhard Fabisch. He earned his debut on 5 Jan 2001 in a friendly against Zambia at the City Stadium.

His competitive debut was away to Gabon during a 2002 AFCON Qualifier Group 3 in Stade Omar Bongo. He played the full 90 minutes.
 
He went on to earn 10 National caps which included five games in 2001 CECAFA Cup.

Career statistics

International

Honours

Club
Mathare United
 Moi Golden Cup: (2001) 
Tusker
 Kenyan Premier League title:(2006/7) 
 Kenyan Premier League title:(2011) 
Gor Mahia
 2012 KPL Top 8 Cup

References

External links
 
 

1981 births
Living people
Kenyan footballers
Nairobi City Stars players
Tusker F.C. players
Kenyan Premier League players
Raufoss IL players
Husqvarna FF players
Wazito F.C. players
Sidama Coffee S.C. players